The Rockpoint Group (Rockpoint) is an American private equity real estate firm headquartered in Boston.

In 2022, the firm was ranked by PERE (under Private Equity International) as the twelfth largest Private Equity Real Estate firm based on total fundraising over the most recent five-year period.

Background 

Rockpoint was founded in 2003 by Bill Walton, Greg Hartman, Jonathan Paul, Keith Gelb and Pat Fox. The five of them were previously managing members of Westbrook Real Estate Partners who left to found the firm. Westbrook Real Estate Partners was co-founded by Walton in 1994 and continued to be controlled by him and Gelb until 2014 where the firm closed. Currently only Walton and Gelb remain with Rockpoint. Paul left in 2007 to co-found Wheelock Street Capital, Hartman left in 2013 to co-found Prospect Hill and Fox retired from the firm.

In March 2018, Blackstone Inc. acquired a 20% stake in Rockpoint.

In October 2020, Rockpoint formed a $1 billion joint venture with Invitation Homes to buy, renovate and rent out single-family homes across the U.S. In March 2022, they formed another joint venture worth $300 million to acquire higher-end single-family homes.

In May 2022, Rockpoint formed a $2 billion industrial real estate platform with a wholly owned subsidiary of the Abu Dhabi Investment Authority.

Rockpoint is headquartered in Boston with additional offices in Dallas, London and San Francisco.

Rockpoint has an affiliate named Rockhill Management which is a dedicated property services management company.

Funds

Investments 
 
 75 State Street
 100 Pine Center
 100 Summer Street
 299 Park Avenue
 1333 H Street
 Austin, Nichols and Company Warehouse
 Boston Park Plaza
 Embarcadero West
 One Dag Hammarskjöld Plaza
 Parc 55 San Francisco
 Park Avenue Plaza
 Parkmerced
 Rodin Studios
 Row NYC Hotel
 Spring Creek Towers
 The Newbury Boston
 Washington Harbour

Disputes 

In November 2019, tenants of 63 Wall Street and 67 Wall Street in Manhattan filed a class-action lawsuit against Rockpoint over alleged rent-regulation violations. Rockpoint was alleged to have failed to follow the 421-g program which allowed it to forgo property taxes but required it to offer rent-regulated leases. Rockpoint was considered to have overcharged above the lease limits while still benefiting from tax breaks. In September 2020, Rockpoint reached a settlement where it would pay out $5 million to 4,800 current and former tenants.

References

External links
 

2003 establishments in Massachusetts
Financial services companies established in 2003
Companies based in Boston
Investment companies of the United States
Real estate companies of the United States